Parliamentary elections were held in Ceylon in March 1965.

Background
The SLFP government of Sirimavo Bandaranaike lost its majority in December 1964 when some MPs deserted it over the nationalization of Lakehouse Newspapers.

Bandaranaike's program of extensive nationalization had alarmed many of the island's business interests, which rallied to the United National Party.  The economy had been stagnant, and rationing had been imposed in the face of persistent food shortages.

The UNP promised to form a National Front government to oppose the SLFP and its Marxist allies.  UNP leader Dudley Senanayake promised cabinet posts both to the small Sinhala nationalist parties and the Illankai Tamil Arasu Kachchi (Federal Party).

Results
The UNP did not obtain a majority, but was able to govern as a National Front with the ITAK's support.

Notes

References

 
 
 
 
 

 
Ceylon
1965 in Ceylon
Parliamentary elections in Sri Lanka
March 1965 events in Asia
Election and referendum articles with incomplete results